The 2017 Bitburger Open was a badminton tournament which took place at Saarlandhalle in Saarbrücken in Germany from 31 October to 5 November 2017 and had a total purse of $120,000.

Tournament
The 2017 Bitburger Open Grand Prix Gold was the fifteenth Grand Prix's badminton tournament of the 2017 BWF Grand Prix Gold and Grand Prix and also part of the Bitburger Open championships which has been held since 1988. This tournament was organized by the 1. BC Saarbrücken-Bischmisheim, with the sanctioned from the BWF.

Venue
This international tournament was held at Saarlandhalle in Saarbrücken in the Germany.

Point distribution
Below is the tables with the point distribution for each phase of the tournament based on the BWF points system for the Grand Prix Gold event.

Prize money
The total prize money for the 2017 tournament was US$120,000. Distribution of prize money was in accordance with BWF regulations.

Men's singles

Seeds

 Anders Antonsen (withdrew)
 Rajiv Ouseph (third round)
 Brice Leverdez (quarterfinals)
 Hsu Jen-hao (final)
 Huang Yuxiang (quarterfinals)
 Qiao Bin (third round)
 Ygor Coelho (quarterfinals)
 Khosit Phetpradab (quarterfinals)
 Emil Holst (third round)
 Fabian Roth (withdrew)
 Lin Yu-hsien (third round)
 Mark Caljouw (semifinals)
 Suppanyu Avihingsanon (third round)
 Lee Zii Jia (semifinals)
 Kim Bruun (third round)
 Iskandar Zulkarnain Zainuddin (third round)

Finals

Top half

Section 1

Section 2

Section 3

Section 4

Bottom half

Section 5

Section 6

Section 7

Section 8

Women's singles

Seeds

 Beiwen Zhang (final)
 Nitchaon Jindapol (champion)
 Busanan Ongbumrungpan (first round)
 Chen Xiaoxin (semifinals)
 Kirsty Gilmour (first round)
 Beatriz Corrales (first round)
 Pornpawee Chochuwong (second round)
 Soniia Cheah (first round)

Finals

Top half

Section 1

Section 2

Bottom half

Section 3

Section 4

Men's doubles

Seeds

Finals

Top half

Section 1

Section 2

Bottom half

Section 3

Section 4

Women's doubles

Seeds

 Gabriela Stoeva / Stefani Stoeva (semifinals)
 Jongkolphan Kititharakul / Rawinda Prajongjai (champion)
 Sara Thygesen / Maiken Fruergaard (second round)
 Olga Morozova / Anastasia Chervyakova (quarterfinals)
 Du Yue / Xu Ya (semifinals)
 Lauren Smith / Sarah Walker (second round)
 Julie Finne-Ipsen / Rikke Søby (withdrew)
 Carla Nelte / Isabel Herttrich (quarterfinals)

Finals

Top half

Section 1

Section 2

Bottom half

Section 3

Section 4

Mixed doubles

Seeds

 Chris Adcock / Gabrielle Adcock (withdrew)
 Wang Chi-lin / Lee Chia-hsin (second round)
 Bodin Isara / Savitree Amitrapai (quarterfinals)
 Mark Lamsfuss / Isabel Herttrich (first round)
 Sam Magee / Chloe Magee (second round)
 Ronald Alexander / Annisa Saufika (withdrew)
 Ronan Labar / Audrey Fontaine (second round)
 Nipitphon Phuangphuapet / Jongkolphan Kititharakul (quarterfinals)

Finals

Top half

Section 1

Section 2

Bottom half

Section 3

Section 4

References

External links
 Official site
 Tournament Link

SaarLorLux Open
BWF Grand Prix Gold and Grand Prix
Open Grand Prix
Sport in Saarbrücken
Bitburger Open Grand Prix Gold
Bitburger Open Grand Prix Gold
Bitburger Open